"Friends and Lovers" is the fourth single from Bernard Butler released in August 1999. It is the first single taken from the album Friends and Lovers. The single had a limited release of one thousand 10" vinyl one sided singles. These were given out to visitors to Butlers website on a first-come first-served basis.

This song is more upbeat with a more pop-rock arrangement than his previous effort.

Single track listings

References

1999 singles
Songs written by Bernard Butler
Creation Records singles
1999 songs